KRMY (1050 AM) was a radio station broadcasting a Gospel format. It was licensed to Killeen, Texas, United States. The station was last owned by Martin Broadcasting, Inc.

History
The station went on the air as KLEN in 1955. On March 9, 1992, the station changed its call sign to KRMY.

Martin Broadcasting requested the immediate cancelation of KRMY and its translator's licenses on December 23, 2022, which occurred on January 5, 2023.

References

External links
FCC Station Search Details: DKRMY (Facility ID: 40490)
FCC History Cards for KRMY (covering 1951-1980 as KLEN / KIXS)

Radio stations established in 1955
Radio stations disestablished in 2023
1955 establishments in Texas
2023 disestablishments in Texas
Defunct radio stations in the United States
Defunct religious radio stations in the United States
RMY
RMY